Samba Diawara (born 15 March 1978) is a former professional footballer who played as a defender. Born in France, he represented the Mali national team. who is the currently assistant manager Belgian Pro League club of Anderlecht.

Club career
Born in Paris, Diawara started his career with Parisian club Red Star 93. He moved to Troyes AC in 1999 and made his debut against Lyon in August.

International career
Diawara has also played international matches for the Mali national team.

Personal life
The defender is the brother of the footballers Fousseni and Abdoulaye.

References

External links
  
 
 

1978 births
Living people
French sportspeople of Malian descent
Citizens of Mali through descent
Malian footballers
French footballers
Footballers from Paris
Mali international footballers
2002 African Cup of Nations players
Association football defenders
Red Star F.C. players
A.F.C. Tubize players
ES Troyes AC players
FC Istres players
Louhans-Cuiseaux FC players
R. Olympic Charleroi Châtelet Farciennes players
Royale Union Saint-Gilloise players
Ligue 1 players
Ligue 2 players
Championnat National players
Championnat National 2 players
Challenger Pro League players
Malian expatriate footballers
French expatriate footballers
Malian expatriate sportspeople in Belgium
French expatriate sportspeople in Belgium
Expatriate footballers in Belgium